Bröllopsfotografen is a Swedish tragicomedy film from 2009. It was directed and written by Ulf Malmros.

Plot
The film is mostly set in Stockholm and in the small industrial town of Molkom in the Swedish province of Värmland, where Robin, an amateur photographer lives. When the factory in Molkom shuts down, Robin leaves his beloved hometown to try his luck in Stockholm as a wedding photographer. His first wedding is an upper-class wedding, where he falls in love with the bride's sister. He tries to fit in the upper-class, and changes not merely his outlook on life but also his hairstyle.

Cast
Björn A. Ling as Robin
Kjell Bergqvist as the unsuccessful actor and Robin's landlord Jonny Björk
Tuva Novotny as Robin's love Astrid
Johannes Brost as Astrid's father Claes 
Lotta Tejle as Gunilla
Tomas Tjerneld as Ove 
Johanna Strömberg  as Malin
Johan Andersson as Bobby
Marianne Scheja as Cecilia
Rebecca Scheja as Elsa
Rebecca Scheja as the bride
Anastasios Soulis as the bridegroom 
Michael Nyqvist as a stage actor 
Jessica Liedberg as a stage actress 
Pontus Olgrim as a baptising assistant 
Erik Lundin as a car dealer 
Pontus Olgrim as a dopvärd

See also
Slim Susie

External links

2009 films
2000s Swedish-language films
2009 comedy-drama films
Tragicomedy films
Swedish comedy-drama films
Värmland in fiction
Films set in Stockholm
Films set in Sweden
2009 in Sweden
Films directed by Ulf Malmros
2000s Swedish films